The Fareynikte Partizaner Organizatsye ("United Partisan Organization"; referred to as FPO by its Yiddish initials) was a Jewish resistance organization based in the Vilna Ghetto in Lithuania that organized armed resistance against the Nazis during World War II. The clandestine organisation was established by Communist and Zionist partisans. Their leaders were writer Abba Kovner, Josef Glazman and Yitzhak Wittenberg.

Establishment of the FPO
The FPO was formed on January 21, 1942, in the Vilna Ghetto. It took on the motto: "We will not allow them to take us like sheep to the slaughter." This was the first Jewish resistance organization that was established in the ghettos of Nazi-occupied Europe during World War II, followed by Łachwa underground formed in August 1942. Unlike in other ghettos – where the underground resistance was coordinated to some extent with the officials of the local Jewish establishment – Vilna's Jacob Gens, head of the ghetto, cooperated with German officials in stopping armed resistance. The FPO brought together Socialist Zionists, right-wing Revisionist Zionists, Communists/Marxists and Bundists. It was headed by Yitzhak Wittenberg, Josef Glazman, and Abba Kovner.

The goals of the FPO were to establish self-defense in the ghetto, to sabotage German industrial and military activities and to join the partisan and Red Army’s fight against the Nazis. Abe (Abba) Kovner, the movement's leader, along with 17 members of the local Zionist group Hashomer Hatzair, stationed at a Polish Catholic convent for an order of Dominican Sisters, sheltered from the Nazis by Mother Superior Anna Borkowska (Sister Bertranda), who was the first to supply hand grenades and other weapons to the Vilnius ghetto underground.

Crushing of the revolt
The FPO did not succeed in its mission. In early 1943, the Germans caught a resistance member in the forest. The Judenrat, one of the widely used administrative agencies imposed by Nazi Germany, in response to German threats, gave Wittenberg over to the Gestapo. The Fareynikte Partizaner Organizatsye organized an uprising. The FPO was able to rescue Wittenberg through an armed struggle and were then able to set up a small militia. The Judenrat did not tolerate this, because the Nazis gave them an ultimatum to end the resistance or face extermination. The Judenrat knew that Jews were smuggling weapons into the ghetto and when a Jew was arrested for the purchase of a revolver, they finally gave the FPO an order to withdraw. The Judenrat turned the people against the resistance members by making them seem like selfish enemies who were provoking the Nazis. Jacob Gens emphasized the people's responsibility for one another. He said that resistance was sacrificing the good of the community. In the end, the people confronted the resistance and demanded their own right to live. The resistance would not fire on the other Jews and they were eventually disarmed and arrested on September 1, 1943.

When the Nazis came to liquidate the ghetto in 1943, the members of the FPO again congregated. Gens took control of the liquidation so as to rid the ghetto of the Germans, but helped fill the quota of Jews with those who would fight but were not necessarily part of the resistance. The FPO fled to the forest, where most were able to reach Soviet partisan units. FPO members participated in the liberation of Vilna by the Soviet army in July 1944.

See also 
Anti-fascism
Ghetto uprising
History of the Jews during World War II
Jewish partisans
Jewish resistance under Nazi rule
Resistance during World War II
Vilna Ghetto
Shtil, di nakht iz oysgeshternt

References

Further reading 
 Yitzhak Arad, Encyclopaedia of the Holocaust vol. 2, pp. 470–472. Illustration.

External links 
The Underground Movements in Vilna from The Jerusalem of Lithuania: The Story of the Jewish Community of Vilna an online exhibition by Yad Vashem
Chronicles of the Vilna Ghetto: wartime photographs & documents – vilnaghetto.com
About the Holocaust 
Jewish Partisan Group Near Vilna
Kurzbiographien
Partisan Rachel Rudnitzky After Liberation
Partisans in Vilna
Partisans of Vilna
Rozka Korczak & Abba Kovner with members of the United Partisan Organization (FPO)
Vilna Partisans
Documentary film project on the former FPO partisan Fania Brancovskaya

Anti-Zionism in Lithuania

Poland in World War II
Jewish Lithuanian history
Jewish Polish history
Jewish resistance during the Holocaust
Military history of Vilnius
The Holocaust in Lithuania
Military units and formations of Poland in World War II
Generalbezirk Litauen
Vilna Ghetto
Yiddish culture in Lithuania
Zionism in Lithuania